Gøran Sørloth (born 16 July 1962 in Kristiansund) is a Norwegian former footballer. He was one of the best strikers in Norwegian football during the late eighties and early nineties.

Club career
In the Norwegian top division he scored 74 goals in 174 matches for Rosenborg, with whom he won five league championships.

Sørloth joined Rosenborg from Strindheim in 1985. Two years later he moved to Borussia Mönchengladbach in Germany, but the spell was unsuccessful and hence short, and Sørloth returned to Rosenborg. In 1993, he once again tried his luck abroad, in Turkish club Bursaspor, but he left in 1994 to play for Viking for the remainder of his career.

International career
In addition, Sørloth scored 15 goals in 55 matches for Norway. Sørloth was a part of the Norwegian 1994 FIFA World Cup squad, and played one match during the tournament. This was his last international match.

Personal life
His son Alexander is also a professional footballer with Real Sociedad.

Honours
Rosenborg
Eliteserien: 1985,  1988, 1990, 1992, 1993
Norwegian Cup: 1988, 1990, 1992

Individual
Kniksen Striker of the Year: 1991, 1992

References

External links

RBKweb - Legend

1962 births
Living people
Sportspeople from Kristiansund
People from Sør-Trøndelag
1994 FIFA World Cup players
Kniksen Award winners
Norwegian footballers
Norway international footballers
Strindheim IL players
Rosenborg BK players
Viking FK players
Borussia Mönchengladbach players
Bursaspor footballers
Norwegian expatriate footballers
Norwegian expatriate sportspeople in Germany
Expatriate footballers in Germany
Norwegian expatriate sportspeople in Turkey
Expatriate footballers in Turkey
Eliteserien players
Bundesliga players
Süper Lig players
Association football forwards